The Poston Internment Camp, located in Yuma County (now in La Paz County) in southwestern Arizona, was the largest (in terms of area) of the ten American concentration camps operated by the War Relocation Authority during World War II.

The site was composed of three separate camps arranged in a chain from north to south at a distance of three miles from each other. Internees named the camps Roasten, Toastin, and Dustin, based on their desert locations.

Poston was built on the Colorado River Indian Reservation, over the objections of the Tribal Council, who refused to be a part of doing to others what had been done to their tribe.  However, Army commanders and officials of the Bureau of Indian Affairs overruled the Council, seeing the opportunity to improve infrastructure and agricultural development (which would remain after the war and aid the Reservation's permanent population) on the War Department budget and with thousands of "volunteers."

The combined peak population of the Poston camps was over 17,000, mostly from Southern California. At the time Poston was the third largest "city" in Arizona. It was built by Del Webb, who would later become famous building Sun City, Arizona and other retirement communities. The Poston facility was named after Charles Debrille Poston, a government engineer who established the Colorado River Reservation in 1865 and planned an irrigation system to serve the needs of the Indian people who would live there.

A single fence surrounded all three camps, and the site was so remote that authorities considered it unnecessary to build guard towers. The thousands of internees and staff passed through the barbed-wire perimeter at Poston I, which was where the main administration center was located.

Poston was a subject of a sociological research by Alexander H. Leighton, published in his 1945 book, The Governing of Men. As Time Magazine wrote, "After fifteen months at Arizona's vast Poston Relocation Center as a social analyst, Commander Leighton concluded that many an American simply fails to remember that U.S. Japanese are human beings."

Establishment of the camp
When Poston was chosen as the site for the relocation center, the Colorado River Indian Reservation Tribal Council adamantly opposed the use of their land because they did not want to be involved in inflicting the same injustice they faced on the Japanese internees. Del Webb (Del E. Webb Construction Company) began building Poston I on March 27, and his workforce of 5,000 completed the first camp less than three weeks later. Construction on II and III began soon after, contracted to be finished within 120 days. In the meantime, Poston was partially opened on May 8, as the Parker Dam Reception Center, one of two such sites that augmented the 15 temporary "assembly centers" where Japanese Americans waited to be transferred to the more permanent WRA camps. Approximately two-thirds of Poston's population were brought directly from their homes to what was then Parker Dam, and many of these early arrivals volunteered to help complete the still under construction camps.

Upon completion, the Poston site consisted of hundreds of residential barracks, a hospital, an administrative center, and guard and staff housing. The camp officially opened as the Colorado River Relocation Center on June 1, 1942, and the BIA relinquished its authority over Poston in 1943.

Life at Poston

Life at Poston for the Japanese internees was difficult from the start. Japanese-Americans across the West Coast were uprooted from their lives and placed in different camps around the United States, including Poston. Hurried construction and lack of supplies made living conditions for internees barely suitable. Barracks were made with redwood, which shrunk more than expected and created cracks throughout the buildings. A shortage of lumber led them to build using adobe.  Weather also added to the difficulties of living in the camp because of its location in the desert. Extreme heat during the summer, reaching up to 115 °F, and extreme cold in the winter, reaching as low as 35 °F, added to the frustrations of internees. Outbreaks of disease were another common factor across most camps that contributed to poor quality of life. Poston was not immune to disease outbreaks and tuberculosis was rampant with 140 reported cases. Care for these sick was also lacking, which led to avoidable death or disability. By the end of 1942, heating systems were still not in place and clothing allowances still hadn't been delivered.

The frustration that was being felt by the internees was mounting, and is seen in this section of an anonymous poem by an internee:

That Damned Fence (anonymous)
...We're trapped like rats in a wired cage,
To fret and fume with impotent rage;
Yonder whispers the lure of the night,
But that DAMNED FENCE assails our sight...

Japanese-Americans in Poston were becoming increasingly frustrated with their new life in the internment camp. Rising tensions came to a head in November 1942, sparked by the beating of a suspected informer on Saturday evening November 14. Two men suspected to have beaten the man were detained and under investigation. The community demanded the release of these two men, and their request was refused. Because of the denial of their request, workers went on strike on November 19. A compromise was reached by the director and the evacuees' Emergency Executive Council, ending the strike on November 24.

Unlike the nine other concentration camps, the agricultural and animal husbandry areas of Poston were within the perimeter fence. Schools and a number of other buildings were constructed by the internees. Many of the inhabitants participated in and created recreational activities, such as the Boy Scouts, sports teams, and jobs. Baseball teams were very common among the internees as leagues were set up soon after opening. Scores and game summaries were recorded in the Poston daily press bulletin, along with other daily news. There were elements that made life at Poston liveable for internees, but their time at the camp was mostly filled with frustration and struggles to the end of their internment.

Written accounts
A camp newspaper Poston Chronicle (formerly Official information bulletin, then Official daily press bulletin) was published between May 1942 and October 1945.

Clara Breed, a librarian from San Diego, made a point of maintaining contact with Poston camp children she had met in San Diego. She corresponded with many of them and sent them reading materials and other gifts. Their letters to her became an important record of life in the camps. Hundreds of "Dear Miss Breed" postcards and letters are now part of the permanent archives at the Japanese American National Museum and were the basis for a 2006 book, Dear Miss Breed: True Stories of the Japanese American Incarceration during World War II and a Librarian Who Made a Difference, by Joanne Oppenheim.

Three reports (Labor; Leisure; Demands) and an autobiography written by Richard Nishimoto, an Issei worker for the University of California's Japanese American Evacuation and Resettlement Study (JERS), were published in Inside an American Concentration Camp: Japanese American Resistance at Poston, Arizona.

A novel by Cynthia Kadohata, Weedflower, illustrates the life of a Japanese American girl and her family after the bombing of Pearl Harbor, when they are incarcerated at Poston. The book is fiction but contains facts from interviews of incarcerees and Mohave Indians who lived on the reservation. The passage on the back of the book reads "Twelve-year-old Sumiko's life can be divided into two parts: before Pearl Harbor and after it. Before the bombing, although she was lonely, she was used to being the only Japanese American in her class and she always had her family to comfort her. When the government forces all of the Japanese Americans living in California into internment camps, Sumiko soon discovers that the Japanese are just as unwanted on the Mohave reservation they have been shipped to as they were at home. But then she meets a young Mohave boy, who, after initial resentment, becomes her first real friend. Together, they navigate the racial and political challenges of the times, and both help each other understand the true meaning of friendship."

In Kiyo's Story, A Japanese American Family's Quest for the American Dream by Kiyo Sato, the Japanese American author writes about her family's time while incarcerated at the Poston, Arizona camp during World War II. This memoir shows how the power of family, love, and relentless hard work helped to overcome the huge personal and material losses endured by internees. Sato went on to achieve professional distinction. She is a registered nurse with a Master's in Nursing and served in the USAF Nurse Corp during the Korean War, where she rose to the rank of captain.

Passing Poston: An American Story is a documentary recounting the experiences of 4 Japanese-Americans in Poston. Their names are Kiyo Sato, Ruth Okimoto, Mary Higashi, and Leon Uyeda. Kiyo Sato's story (recounted above) is from when she is a young girl, and has to face the tragedy of her citizenship being taken away. Ruth Okimoto gives an interesting perspective of the internment as a young girl as well. She remembers soldiers coming to her front door with rifles to take them to Poston, and being behind barbed wire in the middle of the desert. She reflects on this time in her life filled with anxiety through art and is trying to understand her feelings about such a surreal part of her life. Mary Higashi relives the moment she entered the barracks and realized she would have to live with almost nothing. She also talks about how this handicapped her for life, as she was never able to finish college. Lastly, Leon Uyeda gives the opposite side of the internment story saying he somewhat enjoyed the camp. He liked being surrounded by other Japanese people, and not having to bombarded with racial hostility.

The Japanese American Memorial to Patriotism During World War II, located in Washington, DC, features inscriptions of the names of those confined to the Poston center. Filmmaker Reed Leventis depicts the life at Poston camp through a short digital video "Poston: A Cycle of Fear." The video was supported by the National Japanese American Memorial Foundation and will be available for viewing by visitors of the Memorial in Washington DC. http://www.njamf.com/Poston/

Memoirs of the Japanese relocation told by a teacher at Poston Camp 1, "dusty exile" by Catherine Embree Harris, published by Mutual Publishing, 1999.  This softcover book contains photos and illustrations of life in the Poston relocation center until it closed.  Catherine Harris went on to work in the Children's Bureau of the U.S. Department of Education in Washington, DC.  She maintained contact with many of the people she met in Poston throughout her life and retirement in Honolulu, HI.

That Damned Fence (anonymous): Poem from an internee about life at Poston.

They've sunk the posts deep into the ground
They've strung out wires all the way around.
With machine gun nests just over there
And sentries and soldiers everywhere.

We're trapped like rats in a wired cage,
To fret and fume with impotent rage;
Yonder whispers the lure of the night,
But that DAMNED FENCE assails our sight.

We seek the softness of the midnight air,
But that DAMNED FENCE in the floodlight glare
Awakens unrest in our nocturnal quest,
And mockingly laughs with vicious jest.

With nowhere to go and nothing to do,
We feel terrible, lonesome, and blue:
That DAMNED FENCE is driving us crazy,
Destroying our youth and making us lazy.

Imprisoned in here for a long, long time,
We know we're punished—though we've committed no crime,
Our thoughts are gloomy and enthusiasm damp,
To be locked up in a concentration camp.

Loyalty we know, and patriotism we feel,
To sacrifice our utmost was our ideal,
To fight for our country, and die, perhaps;
But we're here because we happen to be Japs.

We all love life, and our country best,
Our misfortune to be here in the west,
To keep us penned behind that DAMNED FENCE,
Is someone's notion of NATIONAL DEFENSE!

Poston today
A number of buildings built for the concentration camps are still in use today. Others, while still intact, are seriously deteriorated and in desperate need of maintenance. The majority were removed after the camp closed and the land returned to the Colorado River Indian Tribes, and many are still in use as utility buildings in surrounding areas, while the former residential areas have been largely converted to agricultural use. The Poston Memorial Monument was built in 1992, on tribal land with tribal support, and still stands today.

Gallery

Notable Poston internees

 Jack Fujimoto (born 1928), the first Asian-American to become president of a higher education institution in the mainland United States
 Tak Fujimoto (born 1939), cinematographer
 Mikiso Hane (1922-2003), professor of history at Knox College
 Frances Hashimoto (1943–2012), businesswoman and community activist

 Satoshi Hirayama (1931–2021), Japanese-American baseball player for the Hiroshima Carp in Japan's Central League
 James Kanno (1925–2017), mayor of Fountain Valley, California from 1957 to 1962
 Yosh Kawano (1921–2018), clubhouse manager for the Chicago Cubs
 Robert Kinoshita (1914–2014), artist, art director, and set and production designer
 Doris Matsui (born 1944), member of the U.S. House of Representatives
 George Matsumoto (1922–2016), architect and educator
 Isamu Noguchi (1904–1988), artist and landscape architect
 Vincent Okamoto (1943–2020), decorated veteran of the Vietnam War and judge
 Daniel Okimoto (born 1942), academic and political scientist
 Emiko Omori (born 1940), cinematographer and director
 Sandra Sakata (1940–1997), fashion designer and fashion retailer
 Ben Sakoguchi (born 1938), artist
 Roy I. Sano (born 1931), retired Bishop of the United Methodist Church
 Hideo Sasaki (1919–2000), landscape architect
 Noriko Sawada (1923–2003), writer and civil rights activist

 T.K. Shindo (1890–1974), photographer
 Teru Shimada (1905–1988), actor
 Kobe Shoji (1920–2004), an executive in the sugar cane industry, veteran of the 442nd Infantry Regiment, and athlete
 Chizuko Judy Sugita de Queiroz (born 1933), artist and art educator
 Shinkichi Tajiri (1923–2009), sculptor
 Ronald Phillip Tanaka (1944–2007), poet and editor

 A. Wallace Tashima (born 1934), the first Japanese-American to be appointed to a United States Court of Appeals
 Hisako Terasaki (born 1928), etcher
 Tamie Tsuchiyama (1915–1984), worked on behalf of the Japanese-American Evacuation and Resettlement Study
 George Uchida (1925–2004), judoka, wrestler, author, and coach
 Hisaye Yamamoto (1921–2011), short-story writer.
 Mia Yamamoto, transgender criminal defense attorney and civil rights activist
 Wakako Yamauchi (1924–2018), playwright

See also
 Japanese American Internment
 Other camps:
 Gila River War Relocation Center This center was also located on an Indian Reservation in Arizona.
 Granada War Relocation Center
 Heart Mountain War Relocation Center
 Jerome War Relocation Center
 Manzanar National Historic Site
 Minidoka National Historic Site
 Rohwer War Relocation Center
 Topaz War Relocation Center
 Tule Lake War Relocation Center

References

 A. A. Hansen and B. K. Mitson, 1974. Voices Long Silent: An Oral Inquiry into the Japanese Evacuation.  This study and many others interviewing former internees at several relocation centers are part of the research of the Japanese American World War II Evacuation History Project, at California State University, Fullerton. Professor Hansen has published extensively in this research arena.
 For a historical interpretation by a tribal member of the Colorado River Indian Reservation, see his chapter on Poston: Dwight Lomayesva, 1981. "The Adaptation of Hopi and Navajo Colonists on the Colorado River Indian Reservation," Master of Social Sciences Thesis (Fullerton, CA: California State University, Fullerton).

External links

 Writings by students at the Poston War Relocation Center, 1942-1943, The Bancroft Library
 Rosalie H. Wax Papers, The Bancroft Library
 Yukiye Kusuda letters to Robert W. Carnachan, 1942-1944, The Bancroft Library
  National Park Service book on internment camps: "Poston War Segregation Center" section
 Poston Preservation Project — by former internees and their descendants.
 Julia Kiriloff Grill correspondence, 1940-1948, The Bancroft Library
 Densho Encyclopedia: "Poston (Colorado River)"
 Densho Encyclopedia: "Poston Chronicle" (camp newspaper)
 Material relating to the Poston Cooperative Enterprises, Inc., Colorado River Relocation Center, Poston, Ariz., 1943-1945, The Bancroft Library
 Mimeograph material relating chiefly to the Young Buddhist Association's activities during the World War II internment, ca.1943-1945, The Bancroft Library
 
 
 

Internment camps for Japanese Americans
Buildings and structures in La Paz County, Arizona
History of La Paz County, Arizona
Military history of Arizona
Prisons in Arizona
1940s in Arizona
1942 establishments in Arizona
1945 disestablishments in Arizona